This article contains significant photo events in 2018.

Events 

  Director Libuše Rudínská made a feature-length documentary on the life and work of Jindřich Štreit on the body. The premiere of the film took place on 27 February in the Metropol cinema in Olomouc.
 Prague Photo, April
 Mesiac fotografie, Bratislava
 International photo festival in Lodz, May
 photokina, Cologne, September
 116th Congress Fédération photographique de France, the beginning of May
 49th Rencontres d'Arles, July - September
 22nd Festival international de la photo animalière et de nature, Montier-en-Der, every third Thursday in November
 Salon de la photo, Paris, November
 Mois de la Photo, Paris, November
 Paris Photo, November
 Visa pour l'image, Perpignan, start of September
 Nordic Light, Kristiansund
 33rd Congress of FIAP

Awards 

  Czech Press Photo – Lukáš Zeman
  World Press Photo – Ronaldo Schemidt and Agence France Presse
  Prix Niépce – Stéphane Lavoué
  Prix Nadar
  Prix de photographie de l'Académie des beaux-arts
  Prix HSBC pour la photographie – Antoine Bruy and Petros Efstathiadis
  Prix Bayeux-Calvados des correspondants de guerre
  Grand Prix Paris Match du photojournalisme
  Prix Carmignac Gestion du photojournalisme
  Prix Roger-Pic
  Prix Lucas Dolega – Narciso Contreras
  Prix Canon de la femme photojournaliste
  Prix Picto
  Prix Tremplin Photo de l'EMI
  Prix Voies Off
  Prix Révélation SAIF
  Oskar Barnack Award – Max Pinckers and Mary Gelman
  Prix Leica Hall of Fame
  Dr. Erich Salomon Award
  Award for the culture of the German Photographic Society
  Hansel Mieth Award
  Zeiss Photography Award
  Sony World Photography Awards
  Prix national de portrait photographique Fernand Dumeunier
  Ansel Adams Award for Conservation Photography
  W. Eugene Smith Grant in Humanistic Photography – Mark Peterson
  Pulitzer Prize
 Pulitzer Prize for Breaking News Photography – Ryan Kelly from The Daily Progress
 Pulitzer Prize for Feature Photography – Reuters photographers
 Robert Capa Gold Medal
  Inge Morath Award
  Infinity Awards – Bruce Davidson, Dayanita Singh, Amber Bracken, Samuel Fosso, Alexandra Bell, Natalie Keyssar a Maurice Berger.
  Lucie Awards
 Higashikawa Prize
  Kimura Ihei Award
  Domon Ken Award
  Ina Nobuo Award
  Miki Jun Award
  Miki Jun Inspiration Award
  Prix Paul-Émile-Borduas
  Duke and Duchess of York Prize in Photography
  The national photographic avard of Spain (Premio Nacional de Fotografía)
  Hasselblad Award – Oscar Muñoz
  Swedish prize for photographic publication
  Roswithy Haftmann Award
  Prix Pictet
  Bowness Photography Prize – Hoda Afshar

References 

2018-related lists
Photography